The Basilica of Our Lady of Mount Carmel is a historic Catholic Church off OH 289 in Youngstown, Ohio, United States.  It was built in 1913 and added to the National Register of Historic Places in 1979 as Our Lady of Mount Carmel Church.  The parish of the Diocese of Youngstown was established in 1906 by the Missionaries of the Precious Blood and local Italian Immigrates.  In 2011 the parish was merged with St. Anthony of Padua parish.  The Holy See elevated the church to a Minor Basilica in 2014.

Each year, an Italian festival is held at the end of July, in the church's parking lot.

References

External links
 Official website

Christian organizations established in 1906
Roman Catholic churches completed in 1913
Churches in the Roman Catholic Diocese of Youngstown
Our Lady of Mount Carmel, Youngstown
National Register of Historic Places in Mahoning County, Ohio
Churches on the National Register of Historic Places in Ohio
Italian-American culture in Ohio
1906 establishments in Ohio
Churches in Youngstown, Ohio
20th-century Roman Catholic church buildings in the United States